Nikola Komazec (Serbian Cyrillic: Никола Комазец; born 15 November 1987) is a Serbian professional footballer who plays as a striker for Bosnian Premier League club Sloboda Tuzla.

Club career
In July 2014, Komazec signed for Norwegian Tippeligaen side FK Haugesund. He moved on loan to Pattaya United in January 2015 for six months.

In February 2016, he moved to Georgian side FC Dinamo Batumi.

On 19 July 2016, he moved to Hong Kong Premier League club South China. However, after the season, South China decided to voluntarily self-relegate in order to cut costs. The club and Komazec agreed to a compensation package to terminate his contract on 9 August 2017.

On 19 August 2017, Egyptian club Smouha announced that they had signed Komazec.

On 27 December 2019, Komazec joined Hong Kong Premier League side Kitchee.

Career statistics

References

External links

1987 births
Living people
People from Vrbas, Serbia
Serbian footballers
Association football forwards
FK Hajduk Kula players
FC Petrolul Ploiești players
NK Maribor players
Nikola Komazec
FK Sarajevo players
Busan IPark players
FK Haugesund players
Nikola Komazec
FC Dinamo Batumi players
South China AA players
Smouha SC players
Salam Zgharta FC players
TSW Pegasus FC players
Southern District FC players
Kitchee SC players
FC Košice (2018) players
Nikola Komazec
Nikola Komazec
FK Sloboda Tuzla players
Serbian SuperLiga players
Liga I players
Slovenian PrvaLiga players
Nikola Komazec
Premier League of Bosnia and Herzegovina players
K League 1 players
Eliteserien players
Erovnuli Liga players
Hong Kong Premier League players
Lebanese Premier League players
Liga 1 (Indonesia) players
Nikola Komazec
Serbian expatriate footballers
Expatriate footballers in Romania
Expatriate footballers in Slovenia
Expatriate footballers in Thailand
Expatriate footballers in Bosnia and Herzegovina
Expatriate footballers in South Korea
Expatriate footballers in Norway
Expatriate footballers in Georgia (country)
Expatriate footballers in Hong Kong
Expatriate footballers in Egypt
Expatriate footballers in Lebanon
Expatriate footballers in Indonesia
Expatriate footballers in Slovakia
Serbian expatriate sportspeople in Romania
Serbian expatriate sportspeople in Slovenia
Serbian expatriate sportspeople in Thailand
Serbian expatriate sportspeople in Bosnia and Herzegovina
Serbian expatriate sportspeople in South Korea
Serbian expatriate sportspeople in Norway
Serbian expatriate sportspeople in Georgia (country)
Serbian expatriate sportspeople in Hong Kong
Serbian expatriate sportspeople in Egypt
Serbian expatriate sportspeople in Lebanon
Serbian expatriate sportspeople in Indonesia
Serbian expatriate sportspeople in Slovakia